The following Swaminarayan temples are located in London, England:

BAPS Shri Swaminarayan Mandir London (locally known as the "Neasden Temple")
 Shri Swaminarayan Mandir, London (Willesden)
 Shri Swaminarayan Mandir, London (Kenton, Harrow)
 Shri Swaminarayan Mandir, London (East London)
 Shri Swaminarayan Mandir, London (Plumstead)
 Shri Swaminarayan Mandir, London (Streatham)
 Shri Swaminarayan Mandir, London (Stanmore) (earlier at Edgware)
 Shri Swaminarayan Manor, London (Gatwick) (at Crawley near London)

Swaminarayan Sampradaya
Hindu temples in London